Events in the year 1900 in Belgium.

Incumbents
Monarch: Leopold II
Prime Minister: Paul de Smet de Naeyer

Events
 4 April – Jean-Baptiste Sipido shoots at the Prince of Wales in Brussels-North railway station
 27 May – Belgian general election, 1900
 3 June – Provincial elections
 2 October – Wedding of King Albert I of Belgium and Elisabeth of Bavaria.

Publications
Periodicals
 Annales de la Société d'Archéologie de Bruxelles, vol. 14 (Brussels, Alfred Vromant)

Scholarship
 Maurice De Wulf, Histoire de la Philosophie Médiévale
 Karl Hanquet, Étude critique sur la Chronique de Saint-Hubert dite Cantatorium
 Henri Pirenne, Histoire de Belgique, vol. 1.
 Max Rooses (ed.), Het schildersboek: Nederlandsche schilders der negentiende eeuw, vol. 4,
 Emile Vandervelde, Le propriété foncière en Belgique

Literature
 Émile Verhaeren, Le cloître (Brussels, Edmond Deman)
 Émile Verhaeren, Petites légendes (Brussels, Edmond Deman)

Births
 13 March – Andrée Bosquet, painter (died 1980)
 1 April – Albert Ayguesparse, writer (died 1996)
 22 May – Vina Bovy, operatic soprano (died 1983)
 19 September – Marguerite Massart, engineer (died 1979)

Deaths
 4 August – Étienne Lenoir (born 1822), engineer
 22 November – Georges Brugmann (born 1829), banker

References

 
1900s in Belgium